Dutchflyer is an integrated passenger service between the United Kingdom and the Netherlands. Formerly known as Amsterdam Express, Dutchflyer is a rail/sea/rail service operated jointly by Stena Line, the Dutch state railway operator Nederlandse Spoorwegen and its UK subsidiary Greater Anglia, and the Rotterdam metro and bus company Rotterdamse Elektrische Tram.

History
The Dutchflyer service is a successor to former boat trains such as the London & North Eastern Railway (LNER) Hook Continental service, which operated between London and the Netherlands from 1927 to 1987.

Originally, the Dutchflyer brand was only used to market the service to passengers starting in the UK, while in the Netherlands the service was advertised as "GoLondon". Nowadays the Dutchflyer brand is not used as prominently and the service is sold through the Dutch Stena Line website.

Booking

Train services

After arriving in Hook of Holland (Hoek van Holland), passengers disembark right into the railway station, which is now part of the Rotterdam Metro. In Rotterdam passengers may change trains to go anywhere in the Netherlands. An example is shown in this table for a connection by rail from Hook of Holland to Rotterdam and then to The Hague or Amsterdam, or stations in between.

See also

Admiraal de Ruijter (London–Amsterdam, 1987–?)
Benjamin Britten (London–Amsterdam, 1987–?)
Eurostar (London–Paris)
Regional Eurostar (Glasgow/Manchester–Paris, proposed)
The Golden Arrow - London–Calais (1929–1972)
Night Ferry (London–Paris/Brussels, 1936–1980)
Venice-Simplon Orient Express (London–Paris–Rome)

Notes

External links

Stena Line website in The Netherlands
Stena Line Website with current information and timetable

Named passenger trains of the United Kingdom
Nederlandse Spoorwegen
Passenger rail transport in the Netherlands
Stena Line
International named passenger trains